Carmen Consoli (born 4 September 1974 in Catania) is an Italian singer-songwriter. She has released 11 studio albums, one greatest hits, one soundtrack album, two live albums, four video album and 33 singles, selling 2 million copies in Italy, certified by M&D and FIMI with a multiplatinum disc, 11 platinum and two gold certifications.

She earned three nominations at the Sanremo Music Festival, one Targa Tenco, one Lunezia Award, seven Italian, Wind & Music Awards, one Telegatto, one David di Donatello, and two Nastri d'argento, and several other awards. In 2012 Consoli has been appointed as a Knight of the Order of Merit of the Italian Republic.

Life and biography

Consoli was born in Catania, and grew up in the small town of San Giovanni la Punta. She started playing guitar at the age of fifteen and she later joined a rock-blues band, the Moon Dog's Party. In 1996 she recorded her first album, Due Parole, and participated to the Festival of Sanremo with the song Amore di plastica.

Her next album, Confusa e felice (1997) sold more than 130,000 copies. In the same year she embarked on her first tour, after some appearances on TV programs. 
In autumn 1998 she released her third album, Mediamente isterica, a particular album representing different kind of female figures. This album did not receive the same success as her previous work, selling around 80,000 copies, but became a favourite amongst her fans.

In 2000 she took part in the Festival of Sanremo for the third time with the song In bianco e nero, when her fourth album Stato di necessità was released.
The album includes two of Carmen's greatest successes, songs Parole di burro and L'ultimo bacio, the last one becoming the official title track for the soundtrack of the film of the same name by Gabriele Muccino, starring Stefano Accorsi and Giovanna Mezzogiorno.
Stato di necessità became her most successful album, selling more than 300,000 copies in a year. In that same year Carmen won two Italian Music Awards and the Nastro D’Argento Award at the Taormina Film Festival in Sicily.

In 2001 she released her first live album, called L'anfiteatro e la bambina impertinente. The album presents all Consoli's greatest hits rearranged with an orchestra of sixty elements with the help of director Paolo Buonvino.

A year later she released her fifth studio album, L'eccezione. The album debuted at number 1 in the Italian album charts, selling more than 200,000 copies.

2003 saw the release of her second live album, Un sorso in più – dal vivo a MTV Supersonic, published with the collaboration of MTV Italy. The album was recorded at MTV's program Supersonic the year before, when Carmen presented to the public L'eccezione.

In 2006 Eva contro Eva, her sixth studio album, was issued. Debuting at number 1, the album showed a new perspective of Carmen's music, this time full of traditional Sicilian sounds and ethnic influences, demonstrating her great diversity. The album contains collaborations with Goran Bregovic and Angelique Kidjo. After a series of concerts through Europe, Canada and the United States Eva contro Eva was published in 2007 in The United States through Universal Latino.

In 2008 third album Mediamente isterica was celebrated through a "Deluxe Edition" and a new tour. Mediamente isterica – Deluxe Edition is the first official "Deluxe Edition" of an Italian artist. The same year she wrote the original soundtrack for the movie L'uomo che ama, directed by Maria Sole Tognazzi and starring Monica Bellucci, Pierfrancesco Favino and Ksenia Rappoport.

Elettra, her seventh studio album, was released on 30 October 2009, including first single Non molto lontano da qui and debuting at number 2 in the FIMI Italian Album Charts.
The album sold in Italy more than 60,000 copies gaining platinum status and won the Targa Tenco for the category "Album of the Year".

During her career she collaborated with many artists: Mario Venuti, Natalie Merchant, Henri Salvador, La Crus, Paola Turci, Marina Rei, Max Gazzè, Franco Battiato, Luca Madonia, Ornella Vanoni, Ron, Marco Di Mauro, Marco Parente, Lucio Dalla, Goran Bregovic and Angelique Kidjo.

She has produced albums by La Camera Migliore, Agata Lo Certo and Lăutari through her label Due Parole, established in Catania.

In November 2010 she released her first best of album, called Per niente stanca. The album was anticipated by the single Guarda l'alba, a collaboration with Tiziano Ferro. The second new song AAA Cercasi was released as a single in January 2011.

In July 2011 she published her first video collection, which includes all her videos from 1996 to 2011 plus some extras.

In November 2012 Carmen Consoli was officially knighted. She received the highest ranking civilian honour of the Italian Republic and was bestowed the title of "Cavaliere" (Knight) of the Order of Merit of the Italian Republic.

Discography

Studio albums
 1996 Due parole (15,000 copies)
 1997 Confusa e felice No. 6 ITA (130,000 copies), Platinum
 1998 Mediamente isterica No. 4 ITA (80,000 copies), Platinum
 2000 Stato di necessità No. 6 ITA (300,000 copies), 3× Platinum
 2002 L'eccezione No. 1 ITA (200,000 copies), 2× Platinum
 2006 Eva contro Eva No. 1 ITA No. 85 CH (80,000 copies), Platinum
 2008 Mediamente isterica – Deluxe Edition No. 22 ITA (11,000 copies)
 2009 Elettra No. 2 ITA (80,000 copies), Platinum
 2015 L'abitudine di tornare No. 3 ITA
 2018 Eco di sirene No. 2 ITA
 2021 Volevo fare la Rockstar No. 2 ITA

Greatest hits albums
 2010 Per niente stanca No. 6 ITA (40,000 copies), Platinum
 2017 The Platinum Collection

Live albums
 2001 L'anfiteatro e la bambina impertinente No. 6 ITA (200,000 copies), 2× Platinum
 2003 Un sorso in più – Dal vivo a MTV Supersonic No. 18 ITALIA
 2018 Eco di Sirene

International albums
 2001 État de necessité – French version of Stato di necessità
 2002/2003 Carmen Consoli – English version of L'Eccezione
 2007 Eva contro Eva – Published in the United States by Universal Latino

Soundtracks
 2008 L'uomo che ama

Singles
 1995 Quello che sento
 1996 Amore di plastica
 1996 Questa notte una lucciola illumina la mia finestra
 1996 Lingua a sonagli
 1997 Confusa e felice No. 3 ITA
 1997 Venere
 1997 Uguale a ieri
 1998 Mai come ieri feat. Mario Venuti
 1998 Bésame Giuda
 1998 Puramente casuale
 1999 Eco di sirene
 1999 Autunno dolciastro
 2000 In bianco e nero No. 10 ITA
 2000 Parole di burro No. 4 ITA
 2000 Orfeo
 2001 L'ultimo bacio
 2001 Gamine impertinente (France)
 2002 L'eccezione No. 4 ITA
 2003 Pioggia d'aprile – Gold Certification (15.000 copies)
 2003 April Showers (Germany and Spain)
 2003 Fiori d'arancio
 2006 Signor Tentenna
 2006 Tutto su Eva
 2009 Domani – Artisti Uniti per l'Abruzzo No. 1 ITA – Multiplatinum Certification (562.000 copies)
 2009 Non molto lontano da qui
 2010 Mandaci una cartolina
 2010 'A finestra
 2010 Guarda l'alba No. 20 ITA
 2011 AAA Cercasi No. 46 ITA
 2015 L'abitudine di tornare
 2015 Sintonia imperfetta
 2015 Ottobre
 2017 Il Conforto (Tiziano Ferro feat. Carmen Consoli) No. 4 ITA

DVDs
 2001 L'anfiteatro e la bambina impertinente
 2008 Eva contro Eva No. 2 ITA
 2009 Amiche per l'Abruzzo No. 1 ITA (250.000 copies)
 2011 Per niente stanca – Video Collection No. 7 ITA

Videos
 1996 Amore di plastica
 1996 Lingua a sonagli
 1998 Mai come ieri feat. Mario Venuti
 1998 Bésame Giuda
 1999 Eco di sirene
 1999 Autunno dolciastro
 2000 Parole di burro
 2001 L'ultimo bacio
 2002 L'eccezione
 2003 Pioggia d'aprile
 2003 Fiori d'arancio
 2006 Signor Tentenna
 2006 Tutto su Eva
 2009 Non molto lontano da qui
 2010 Guarda l'alba
 2011 AAA cercasi
 2015 L'abitudine di tornare
 2015 Sintonia imperfetta
 2015 Ottobre
 2017 Il conforto (Tiziano Ferro feat. Carmen Consoli)

References

Further reading
 Federico Guglielmi, Quello che sento. Il mondo, i pensieri, la musica di Carmen Consoli, Giunti Editore, 2006, pp. 194. 
 Elena Raugei, Carmen Consoli. Fedele a se stessa, Arcana Editore, 2010, pp. 260.

External links

 (Archived)

1974 births
Living people
Musicians from Catania
Italian singer-songwriters
Italian folk singers
21st-century Italian singers
Knights of the Order of Merit of the Italian Republic